John Hawks ( – February 16, 1790) was a British-born American architect remembered as the dominant force in North Carolinian architecture for two decades, and a major designer of some of New Bern's most notable structures. He also served as the first auditor of North Carolina from 1784 until his death.

Biography
Hawks was born in England, c. 1731. He died at New Bern, North Carolina, on February 16, 1790.

Buildings

Several of Hawks's buildings are listed on the U.S. National Register of Historic Places (NRHP).

 Coor House,  built 1767, 501 E. Front St., New Bern, North Carolina, NRHP-listed
 Governor's Palace, built 1770, 501 E. Front St., New Bern, North Carolina
 Stanly House, built ca. 1779, 307 George St., New Bern, North Carolina, NRHP-listed 
 One or more works in Edenton Historic District, roughly bounded by E. & W. Freemason, S. Oakum, E. & W. Water, and Mosely Sts. Edenton, North Carolina, NRHP-listed

See also
 List of people with gout

References

External links

 Official
 John Hawks Papers at the University of North Carolina at Chapel Hill
 General information
 John Hawks at NCpedia
 John Hawks at North Carolina Architects & Builders

 
Year of birth uncertain
1731 births
1790 deaths
18th-century American architects
18th-century Anglicans
18th-century American Episcopalians
18th-century English architects
British emigrants to the Thirteen Colonies
Deaths in North Carolina
People of colonial North Carolina
State Auditors of North Carolina